Solomon Sutherland (1762 – September 10, 1802) was an American politician from New York.

Life
He lived in Stanford, Dutchess County, New York.

He married Tamma Thompson (1764–1790) who died shortly after the birth of their daughter Tamma (1790–1793*).

He was a member of the New York State Assembly (Dutchess Co.) in 1796; and of the New York State Senate (Middle D.) from 1800 until his death in 1802.

His son Jacob Sutherland (ca. 1787–1845) was a justice of the New York Supreme Court from 1823 to 1836.

According to his will, he had a daughter named Tamma who was still living in 1802: "New York Probate Records, 1629-1971," images, FamilySearch (https://familysearch.org/pal:/MM9.3.1/TH-1961-28664-41326-37?cc=1920234 : accessed 8 March 2016), Dutchess > Wills 1796-1806 vol B > image 249 of 418; county courthouses, New York.

Sources
The New York Civil List compiled by Franklin Benjamin Hough (pages 117f, 146 and 169; Weed, Parsons and Co., 1858)

External links

1762 births
1802 deaths
Members of the New York State Assembly
New York (state) state senators
People from Stanford, New York
New York (state) Democratic-Republicans